Earl Alonzo Moore (July 29, 1879 – November 28, 1961) was an American professional baseball pitcher who had a 14-year career in Major League Baseball.

Biography

Moore's sidearm throwing style earned him the nickname "Crossfire". His contract was purchased by the Cleveland Blues from Dayton, Ohio, for $1000. On May 9, 1901, he pitched the American League's first no-hitter, only to lose the game in the tenth inning. He was also the first pitcher in the 20th century to lose a no-hit game. In , he led the league with a 1.77 ERA, going 19–9.

In 1908, he pitched 26 innings and did not allow an earned run. , no other pitcher has thrown more than 20 innings in a season without allowing an earned run.

He lost 19 games the following year. In , he was traded to the Chicago Cubs.

His career record was 161–154 with a 2.78 ERA.  He pitched 230 complete games.

See also
 List of Major League Baseball annual ERA leaders
 List of Major League Baseball annual strikeout leaders
 List of Major League Baseball career hit batsmen leaders

References

External links

1879 births
1961 deaths
Major League Baseball pitchers
Baseball players from Ohio
Cleveland Blues (1901) players
Cleveland Bronchos players
Cleveland Naps players
New York Highlanders players
Philadelphia Phillies players
Chicago Cubs players
Buffalo Buffeds players
American League ERA champions
National League strikeout champions
People from Pickerington, Ohio
Dayton Veterans players
Jersey City Skeeters players